Park Plaza Mall is an enclosed shopping mall located in the Midtown neighborhood of Little Rock, Arkansas. Originally opened as an open-air shopping center in 1960, the mall is now home to two Dillard's flagship stores and merchants including H&M, Talbots, and Eddie Bauer.

History 
Upon opening in 1960, Park Plaza was considered the first major shopping center in West Little Rock (now called Midtown, and today's West Little Rock is further west) and was eventually blamed for the exodus of retail stores from downtown Little Rock. Park Plaza Shopping Center, as it was originally named, consisted of retail stores, as well as a grocery store, bowling alley, and cafeteria. In 1963, Gus Blass, a downtown Little Rock department store founded in the 1860s, announced plans to build a store at Park Plaza. Its Park Plaza location opened in 1965, becoming the first large store from downtown Little Rock to open a branch at Park Plaza. The site of the defunct store's downtown location still stands today and is registered on the National Register of Historic Places. In 1964, Gus Blass was sold to Little Rock-based Dillard's; in 1967, the Park Plaza Gus Blass was rebranded as Pfeifer-Blass, and in 1974, it finally became Dillard's. Dillard's is still at Park Plaza today with two separate stores at the mall: Dillard's East and Dillard's West; the two locations serve as company flagship locations.

In 1967, the enclosed, "revolutionary" University Mall opened one block south of Park Plaza Shopping Center. Just as Park Plaza had caused retail stores to migrate from downtown Little Rock to its location, University Mall caused a migration from Park Plaza down the street to the new, enclosed, and air-conditioned University Mall. For about 20 years, Park Plaza struggled along as University Mall established itself as the more desirable shopping location in Little Rock. The University Mall went through two renovations, including adding an additional story to the structure, reaching a size of 535,000 square feet. In response, Park Plaza Shopping Center temporarily closed in 1987 to undergo  in renovations and reopened in 1988 as Park Plaza Mall, a three-story enclosed mall with 680,000 square feet and a movie theater. University Mall was eventually demolished in 2007.

2013 murder 
In 2013, an ex-Sbarro employee shot two Sbarro employees, including a supervisor, at Park Plaza Mall, leaving the supervisor dead and a female employee critically injured with eight gunshot wounds. The man charged in the death was found guilty and sentenced to life in prison in 2014. His accomplice, who pleaded guilty to first-degree murder, attempted capital murder, and aggravated robbery was sentenced to 40 years in prison.

Foreclosure 
In 2021, the mall went into foreclosure due to a  loan originating in 2011. The owners of the mall at the time, CBL Properties of Chattanooga, Tennessee, claimed they did not make enough income to afford the required payments. The trustee for the holders of the original loan against the mall, Deutsche Bank, took ownership of the mall after a Pulaski County circuit judge granted an  judgment against CBL and granted immediate possession of the mall to Deutsche. Shortly after, Deutsche was the sole bidder of $100,000 at the mall's foreclosure auction. Deutsche operates the mall under the LLC The Woodmount Company and currently markets Park Plaza as "the premier shopping center in Little Rock." The two Dillard's locations at Park Plaza were not included in the sale, as Dillard's owns the buildings, lots, and associated parking structures.

See also

References

Shopping malls in Arkansas
Shopping malls established in 1960
Buildings and structures in Little Rock, Arkansas
Tourist attractions in Little Rock, Arkansas
1960 establishments in Arkansas
Shopping centers in the Little Rock Metro